James Bryce Whitford (born July 23, 1971) is an American college basketball coach and the former head coach of the Ball State Cardinals men's basketball program. Before he was hired at Ball State, Whitford served as an assistant coach at Miami (Ohio), Xavier, and Arizona.

Coaching career
While enrolled at the University of Wisconsin–Madison Whitford spent three seasons as a student manager for the Badgers men's basketball team.  He graduated with a bachelor's degree in political science in 1994.

Whitford's first professional coaching experience was with the Miami RedHawks men's basketball program.  Starting as an administrative assistant 1994, he became an assistant coach in 1997 and advanced to top assistant in 1998.

In 2005 Whitford left Miami for Xavier, where he spent four seasons under head coach Sean Miller before following Miller to Arizona in April 2009.  After his first two seasons at Arizona Whitford was promoted to associate head coach, a position he held for another two years before taking the head coaching position at Ball State in April 2013. On March 14, 2022, Ball State fired Whitford after nine years as head coach.  Whitford finished his time at Ball State compiling an overall record of 131–145 and a conference record of 66–90.

Head coaching record

References

External links
 Ball State profile

1971 births
Living people
American men's basketball coaches
Arizona Wildcats men's basketball coaches
Ball State Cardinals men's basketball coaches
Basketball coaches from Wisconsin
Miami RedHawks men's basketball coaches
Sportspeople from Madison, Wisconsin
University of Wisconsin–Madison alumni
Xavier Musketeers men's basketball coaches